The 519th Air Defense Group  is a disbanded United States Air Force organization. Its last assignment was with the 4709th Air Defense Wing, stationed at Suffolk County Air Force Base, New York, where it was inactivated in 1955.  The group was originally activated as a support unit for the 485th Bombardment Group at the end of World War II in It/aly and then redeployed to the United States where it was inactivated in 1945.

The group was activated once again in 1953, when ADC established it as the headquarters for a dispersed fighter-interceptor squadron and the medical, maintenance, and administrative squadrons supporting it.  It was replaced in 1955 when ADC transferred its mission, equipment, and personnel to the 52d Fighter Group in a project that replaced air defense groups commanding fighter squadrons with fighter groups with distinguished records during World War II.

History

World War II and Post-War
The group was activated as the 519th Air Service Group in Italy shortly before the end of World War II in early 1945 as part of a reorganization of Army Air Forces (AAF) support groups in which the AAF replaced Service Groups that included personnel from other branches of the Army and supported two combat groups with Air Service Groups including only Air Corps units. Designed to support a single combat group. Its 945th Air Engineering Squadron provided maintenance that was beyond the capability of the combat group, its 769th Air Materiel Squadron handled all supply matters, and its Headquarters & Base Services Squadron provided other support. It supported the 485th Bombardment Group in Italy. The group returned to the US, where it continued to support heavy bombardment groups.  The group was scheduled to move overseas in 1946, but its movement was cancelled. It was reduced to nominal strength of 4 officers and 7 enlisted men in March 1946, but re-manned in April. The group deployed to Alaska with the 97th Bombardment Group. It was replaced by 97th Airdrome Group, 97th Maintenance & Supply Group, and 97th Station Medical Group as part of the Air Force Wing/Base reorganization (Hobson Plan) in 1947, which was designed to unify control at air bases. It was disbanded in 1948.

Cold War
The 519th was reconstituted, redesignated as an air defense group, and activated at Suffolk County AFB in 1953 with responsibility for air defense of the Northeastern United States.  It was assigned the 45th Fighter-Interceptor Squadron (FIS) and 75th FIS, which were already stationed at Suffolk County AFB, flying North American F-86 Sabres as its operational components. The 45th FIS and 75th FIS had been assigned directly to the 4709th Defense Wing. The group replaced 77th Air Base Squadron as USAF host unit at Suffolk County AFB.  It was assigned three squadrons to perform its support responsibilities. Eight days later, the 331st FIS, equipped with a radar equipped and Mighty Mouse rocket armed model of the "Sabre" was activated and assigned to the group. In May 1953, the 45th FIS moved to Morocco and was reassigned away from the group. Later in 1953, the 75th FIS upgraded to improved radar equipped "Sabres".

The 519th was inactivated and replaced by the 52d Fighter Group (Air Defense) as result of Air Defense Command's Project Arrow, which was designed to bring back on the active list the fighter units which had compiled memorable records in the two world wars. The group was disbanded once again in 1984.

Lineage
 Constituted as: 519th Air Service Group
 Activated on 20 January 1945
 Inactivated 1 December 1947
 Disbanded 8 October 1948
 Reconstituted and redesignated as: 519th Air Defense Group on 21 January 1953
 Activated on 16 February 1953
 Inactivated on 18 August 1955
 Disbanded on 27 September 1984

Assignments
 Unknown, 20 January 1945 – ca. May 1945 (probably XV Air Force Service Command)
 20th Bombardment Wing (later VIII Bomber Command), ca.1945 – March 1946
 Fifteenth Air Force, March 1946 – 1947
 4709th Defense Wing (later 4709th Air Defense Wing), 16 February 1953 – 18 August 1955

Stations
 Venosa Airfield, Italy, 20 January 1945 – 8 May 1945
 Capodichino Airport, Naples, Italy, 8 May 1945 – 15 May 1945
 Camp Patrick Henry, VA, 24 May 1945 – 24 May 1945
 Sioux City Army Air Base, IA, Jul 1945–8 September 1945
 Salina Army Airfield, KS, 8 September 1945 – 4 October 1947
 Mile 26 Field, AK, 4 October 1947 – 1 December 1947
 Suffolk County AFB, NY, 6 February 1952 – 18 August 1955

Components

Operational Squadrons
 45th Fighter-Interceptor Squadron, 16 February 1953 – 28 May 1953
 75th Fighter-Interceptor Squadron, 16 February 1953 – 18 August 1955
 331st Fighter-Interceptor Squadron, 24 February 1953 – 18 August 1955

Support Units
 519th Air Base Squadron, 16 February 1953 – 18 August 1955
 519th Materiel Squadron, 16 February 1953 – 18 August 1955
 519th Medical Squadron (later 519th USAF Infirmary), 16 February 1953 – 18 August 1955
 769th Air Materiel Squadron, 20 January 1945 – 1 December 1947
 945th Air Engineering Squadron, 20 January 1945 – 1 December 1947

Aircraft
 F-86A 1953
 F-86F 1953
 F-86D, 1953–1955

See also
 List of United States Air Force Aerospace Defense Command Interceptor Squadrons
 List of F-86 Sabre units

References

Notes

Bibliography

 Buss, Lydus H.(ed), Sturm, Thomas A., Volan, Denys, and McMullen, Richard F., History of Continental Air Defense Command and Air Defense Command July to December 1955, Directorate of Historical Services, Air Defense Command, Ent AFB, CO, (1956)

Further reading
 Grant, C.L., (1961)  The Development of Continental Air Defense to 1 September 1954, USAF Historical Study No. 126

External links

0519
Aerospace Defense Command units
Military units and formations disestablished in 1984
Military units and formations established in 1953